Gordonia caeni is a Gram-positive, strictly aerobic, short-rod-shaped and non-motile bacterium from the genus Gordonia which has been isolated from sludge from a sewage disposal plant in Daejeon in Korea.

References

External links
Type strain of Gordonia caeni at BacDive -  the Bacterial Diversity Metadatabase	

Mycobacteriales
Bacteria described in 2012